Kevin Ulanski (born May 19, 1982) is an American professional ice hockey player.

He played for the Colorado Eagles in the Central Hockey League during the 2010–11 CHL season. Ulanski ranks 5th on the team's all-time scoring list with 288 points (93-195-288) in 193 games (1.5 points-per-game). In 2009-10, he won the CHL's scoring title with 109 of those points, becoming just the second Eagles player to top the 100-point plateau in a season.

A former standout at the University of Denver, where he played between 2001–2005 and won back-to-back NCAA championships, Ulanski has found great success in the past when paired with Eagles captain Riley Nelson. In their three seasons together—in addition to helping each other win successive CHL MVP awards—they have combined for 557 points (an average of 93 points per player, per season).

Ulanski did not start the 2011–12 season, although he was arguably the best player on the team, or even the league, as he needed to stay in Greeley in order to make a living. However, on Saturday 26 November 2011, Kevin Ulanski re-signed with the team, who are now in the ECHL.  During that game he netted one goal and provided one assist as the Colorado Eagles beat the Idaho Steelheads 6-3.

Awards and honors

References

External links

1982 births
Albany River Rats players
American men's ice hockey forwards
Colorado Eagles players
Denver Pioneers men's ice hockey players
Elmira Jackals (ECHL) players
Ice hockey players from Wisconsin
Living people
Long Beach Ice Dogs (ECHL) players
Milwaukee Admirals players
NCAA men's ice hockey national champions
Phoenix RoadRunners players
Rockford IceHogs (UHL) players
Sportspeople from Madison, Wisconsin